La Zarza may refer to the following places in Spain:

 La Zarza, Badajoz, a municipality in the province of Badajoz, Extremadura.
 La Zarza, Valladolid, a municipality in the province of Valladolid, Castile and León.
 La Zarza-Perrunal, a municipality in the province of Huelva, Andalusia.
 La Zarza de Pumareda, a municipality in the province of Salamanca, Castile and León.
 Santa Cruz de la Zarza, a municipality in the province of Toledo, part of the autonomous community of Castile-La Mancha.

See also 
 Zarza (disambiguation)